The 1978 Giro d'Italia was the 61st running of the Giro, one of cycling's Grand Tours. It started in Saint-Vincent, on 7 May, with a  prologue and concluded in Milan, on 28 May, with a  mass-start stage. A total of 130 riders from thirteen teams entered the 20-stage race, that was won by Belgian Johan de Muynck of the Bianchi team. The second and third places were taken by Italians Gianbattista Baronchelli and Francesco Moser, respectively. As of the beginning of the 2021 cycling season this was the last time a Belgian rider won a Grand Tour.

Amongst the other classifications that the race awarded, Sanson's Moser won the points classification, Ueli Sutter of Zonca won the mountains classification, and Vibor's Roberto Visentini completed the Giro as the best neo-professional in the general classification, finishing fifteenth overall. Bianchi finishing as the winners of the team points classification.

Teams

A total of 13 teams were invited to participate in the 1978 Giro d'Italia. Each team sent a squad of ten riders, so the Giro began with a peloton of 130 cyclists. Out of the 130 riders that started this edition of the Giro d'Italia, a total of 90 riders made it to the finish in Milan.

The teams entering the race were:

Route and stages

The route for the race was revealed on 8 March 1978. The start of the race was moved up one week and three stage were cancelled so the race did not interfere with the World Cup that started on 1 June in Argentina. The fourteenth stage took the race into the Venice for a time trial. As the city was not conducive to the event, four ramps were created to allow for riders to ride up and down on canal crossings, as well as one floating bridge over the Grand Canal.

Classification leadership

There were four main individual classifications contested in the 1978 Giro d'Italia, as well as a team competition. Four of them awarded jerseys to their leaders. The general classification was the most important and was calculated by adding each rider's finishing times on each stage. The rider with the lowest cumulative time was the winner of the general classification and was considered the overall winner of the Giro. The rider leading the classification wore a pink jersey to signify the classification's leadership.

The second classification was the points classification. Riders received points for finishing in the top positions in a stage finish, with first place getting the most points, and lower placings getting successively fewer points. The rider leading this classification wore a purple (or cyclamen) jersey. The mountains classification was the third classification and its leader was denoted by the green jersey. In this ranking, points were won by reaching the summit of a climb ahead of other cyclists. Each climb was ranked as either first, second or third category, with more points available for higher category climbs.  Most stages of the race included one or more categorized climbs, in which points were awarded to the riders that reached the summit first. The Cima Coppi, the race's highest point of elevation, awarded more points than the other first category climbs. The Cima Coppi for this Giro was the Passo Valles, which was first summitted by Italian rider Gianbattista Baronchelli. The fourth classification, the young rider classification, was decided the same way as the general classification, but exclusive to neo-professional cyclists (in their first three years of professional racing). The leader of the classification wore a white jersey.
 
The final classification, the team classification, awarded no jersey to its leaders. This was calculated by adding together points earned by each rider on the team during each stage through the intermediate sprints, the categorized climbs, stage finishes, etc. The team with the most points led the classification.

There were other minor classifications within the race, including the Campionato delle Regioni classification. The leader wore a blue jersey with colored vertical stripes ("maglia azzurra con banda tricolore verticale"). The Fiat Ritmo classification, which was created in honor Juan Manuel Santisteban who died in stage 1A of 1976 edition. The winner of the sprint in each stage received a Fiat Ritmo.

Final standings

General classification

Points classification

Mountains classification

Young rider classification

Campionato delle Regioni classification

Traguardo Fiat Ritmo classification

Team points classification

References

Citations

 
Giro
Giro d'Italia
Giro d'Italia by year
Giro d'Italia
1978 Super Prestige Pernod